Souleimane Konate (born February 4, 1984) is a French heavyweight kickboxer.

Biography and career 

Souleimane Konate joined Faucon Gym in 2005.

His first success in K-1 came on August 19, 2007 at K-1 2007 Hungary, when he defeated Ferencz József and Jánosi László and reached the tournament finals, where he was stopped by Dániel Török by unanimous decision.

On December 8, 2007 at K-1 World GP Final in Yokohama, Japan, Konaté was scheduled to fight on a Superfight against Musashi but was forced to pull out due to injuries and was replaced by David Dancrade.

Titles 
 2012 K-1 rules French Cup Heavyweight Champion
 2012 Kickboxing French Cup Heavyweight Champion 
 2007 K-1 Fighting Network Hungary runner up
 2006 "Urban Trip" Full Contact tournament Champion, Montelimar, France
 2006 Heavy Weights Academy “K-1 rules” Champion, Tournai, Belgium 
 2005 French Kickboxing Champion

Kickboxing record

External links
Profile at fansofk1.com
Profile at k-1sport.de

References

1984 births
Living people
French male kickboxers
Heavyweight kickboxers
Sportspeople from Paris
French Muay Thai practitioners